Seldom Disappointed: A Memoir is the 2001 autobiography of author Tony Hillerman. The title reflects the attitude that he learned as a child living on a farm in Oklahoma; if one learns not to have unrealistic expectations, one will often be pleasantly surprised and seldom disappointed.

Reception
The work was well received, with the New York Times Book Review stating that Hillerman "is an expert at knowing what to leave out, and at making what he leaves in cut to the bone without seeming overwrought", and further that the prose is "laced with humor and worldly wisdom"; stating that "Seldom Disappointed is a splendid and disarming remembrance of things past". It was also well reviewed by David Langness, for Paste magazine, who called the book "touching", "modest" and "powerful", and stated that "Seldom Disappointed unfolds with the quiet country cadences of the storytellers that consistently suffuse Hillerman's prose" and praising its "hilarious, perverse black humor".

Awards
2001 Agatha Award, best non-fiction work
2002 Anthony Award, best non-fiction / critical work
2002 Macavity Award nomination, best biographical / critical mystery work

References

2001 non-fiction books
Books by Tony Hillerman
Agatha Award-winning works
Anthony Award-winning works
HarperCollins books
Books about New Mexico
American memoirs